Snak the Ripper is a Canadian rapper from British Columbia.

Affiliations 
Snak the Ripper is one of the founding members of the Stompdown Killaz hip hop collective (SDK). As of 2018 Snak is no longer affiliated with SDK.  In 2010, he became a member of 100MAD (hip hop collective founded by Fredro Starr and Sticky Fingaz of New York City rap group Onyx). He is also the founder, president and CEO of Stealth Bomb Records.

Early years 
Snak the Ripper got his start in a suburb located near Vancouver. In 2001, he was charged with 150 counts of mischief, but due to lack of evidence, the charges were dropped. It was also in 2001 that he had acquired the name "Snak", adding "The Ripper" to his name when he started rapping in 2007.

Between 2003 and 2006, Snak moved around between Vancouver, Montreal and Toronto to perfect his graffiti skills and build notoriety in the Canadian hip hop scene. He was homeless and struggled with substance abuse, using his love for writing songs as an escape.

Career 
Snak released his debut album The Ripper in 2007. His 2016 release From the Dirt debuted at No. 1 on iTunes Hip Hop & Rap Charts. He was nominated for "Hip Hop Recording of the Year" at the Western Canadian Music Awards in 2015 and 2016.

In 2012, Snak the Ripper collaborated with Dubstep producer Datsik. He collaborated with Crooked I, Snowgoons, Ill Bill, Mobb Deep and Onyx. In 2016, Snak the Ripper collaborated with Outlawz. In 2020, he collaborated with Dax and Classified.

Discography

Albums 
 The Ripper (2007; self-released)
 Fatt Snak (2008; Low Pressure Fried Chicken)
 Sex Machine (2009; Camobear Records)
 Fear of a Snak Planet (2011; self-released)
 White Dynamite (2012; Camobear Records)
 Just Giver (2014; Stealth Bomb Records)
 From the Dirt (2016; Stealth Bomb Records)
 Off the Rails (2018; Stealth Bomb Records)
 Let It Rip (2022, Stealth Bomb Records)

Appearances 

 Vitamin D by Datsik (2012)
 "SDK" by Caspian (2012)
 Beautiful Death Machine by Swollen Members (2013)
 WakeDaFucUp by Onyx (2014)
 Built Like This  by Caspian (2015)
 Gypsy Rose' by Jaclyn Gee (2015)
 Goon Bap by Snowgoons (2016)
 Shotgunz in Hell by Onyx & Dope D.O.D. (2017)
 What You Make It by Junk (2017)
 Move in Silence by Snak the Ripper & Merkules (2019)
 Joe Fixit by Ill Bill (2019)
 Rap Shit by Classified feat. Dax and Snak the Ripper (2020)
 Wrath & Pride'' by Slaine (2021)

References

External links 
 

1982 births
Living people
Canadian male rappers
Musicians from British Columbia
People from New Westminster
21st-century Canadian rappers
21st-century Canadian male musicians